Only Love Can Break a Heart is the second album by songwriter and recording artist Gene Pitney, released on the Musicor label in 1962. It included the top 10 hits "Only Love Can Break a Heart" (#2) and "(The Man Who Shot) Liberty Valance" (#4), which was written for but not ultimately used in, the film of the same name. Three other singles from the album also charted; "Half Heaven-Half Heartache" at #12, "True Love Never Runs Smooth" at #21, and "If I Didn't Have a Dime" at #58.

Track listing

Side 1
"True Love Never Runs Smooth" (Hal David, Burt Bacharach) – 2:26
"Cry Your Eyes Out" (Ben Raleigh, John Gluck, Jr) – 2:04
"Only Love Can Break a Heart" (David, Bacharach) – 2:49
"Donna Means Heartbreak" (David, Paul Hampton) – 2:23
"I Should Try to Forget" (Aaron Schroeder, Gloria Shayne, Martin Kalmanoff) – 2:12
"My Heart, Your Heart" (Bob Halley) – 2:23

Side 2
"Half Heaven – Half Heartache" (Schroeder, George Goehring, Wally Gold) – 2:43
"Tower-Tall" (Mel Mandel, Norman Sachs) – 3:21
"(The Man Who Shot) Liberty Valance" (David, Bacharach) – 2:58
"Little Betty Falling Star" (Bob Hilliard, Bacharach) – 2:22
"If I Didn't Have a Dime" (Bert Russell, Phil Medley) – 2:31
"Going to Church on Sunday" (Halley) – 2:53

Personnel
Gene Pitney – vocals
Alan Lorber, Burt Bacharach, Chuck Sagle – arranger, conductor
Maurice Seymour – cover photography
Norman Weiser – artwork

References

1962 albums
Gene Pitney albums
Musicor Records albums
Albums arranged by Burt Bacharach